Dr. Herbert Michaelis (3 September 1898 — 14 June 1939) was a German lawyer and Communist, and a member of the German Resistance during the Third Reich.

Biography 
Michaelis was born in Hamburg, the son of a Jewish businessman. He served from 1916 to 1918, during the First World War. He started his law practice in Hamburg in 1928, and that same year, he married Marie-Luise Rom, with whom he had three children. He joined the Communist Party of Germany (KPD) in 1924. In 1933, the year the National Socialists seized power, someone anonymously denounced him to the Gestapo. The Nazis began to restrict what Jews could do, and Michaelis was prohibited from practicing his profession, as a result. Shortly after that, he was fraudulently accused of an offense, and was sentenced to two years in a Zuchthaus.

At Lübeck Zuchthaus, he got to know the lathe operator, Bruno Rieboldt, and metalworker, Dagobert Biermann (father of former East German dissident, Wolf Biermann). After their release, Rieboldt and Biermann went to work at the Hamburg warfs for Blohm + Voss. Rieboldt informed Michaelis about armaments work at Blohm + Voss, particularly regarding the construction of airplane motors and warships.

The goal of the Resistance group around Michaelis was to expose to the world the Nazi's secret involvement in the Spanish Civil War. Biermann and his brother-in-law, Karl Dietrich, a ship captain, reported to Michaelis on the weapons shipments from January to March 1937 to Francisco Franco. Michaelis relayed this information in January and February 1937 through a middle man, Richard Bähre, who, in turn, forwarded it to the exiled KPD leadership in Basel.

On March 26, 1937, Rieboldt was arrested. Two days later, Michaelis and Biermann were arrested. Michaelis was convicted by the second Senate of the Volksgerichtshof in Hamburg and sentenced to death. He was executed on 14 June 1939 at Plötzensee Prison in Berlin.<ref>H. Eschwege. "Resistance" The Leo Baeck Institute Yearbook" (1970)</ref> Reiboldt received a 12-year sentence, and Biermann was sentenced to six years at hard labor in a Zuchthaus. Only Dietrich was allowed to go free.

 Memorials 
Michaelis is included in the names on the monument unveiled in 2007, honoring the lawyers who perished at the hands of the National Socialists. The monument stands in front of the House of German Lawyers' Association in Berlin. There is a stolperstein for him at Isestraße 23, in Hamburg.

 Further reading 
Wilfried Weinke. The Leo Baeck Institute Yearbook 1997, Vol. 42, No. 1, The Persecution of Jewish Lawyer in Hamburg. A Case Study: Max Eichholz and Herbert Michaelis, pp. 221–237
Ursel Hochmuth and Gertrud Meyer. Streiflichter aus dem Hamburger Widerstand 1933–1945. Berichte und Dokumente. Röderberg, Frankfurt am Main (1980) p. 190 
Angelika Ebbinghaus and Karten Linne (Editors). Kein abgeschlossenes Kapitel. Hamburg im "Dritten Reich". Article called "Die Verfolgung jüdischer Rechtsanwälte Hamburgs am Beispiel von Dr. Max Eichholz und Herbert Michaelis" by Wilfried Weinke. Europäische Verlagsanstalt, Hamburg (1997) pp. 248–265 
Peter Steinbach and Johannes Tuchel. Lexikon des Widerstandes 1933–1945, C. H. Beck, München (1998) 2nd edition, p. 138 
Ludwig Eiber. Arbeiter und Arbeiterbewegung in der Hansestadt Hamburg in den Jahren 1929 bis 1939. Werftarbeiter, Hafenarbeiter und Seeleute: Konformität, Opposition, Widerstand, "Die Gruppe um Herbert Michaelis", p. 352 P. Lang, Frankfurt am Main (2000) 
Franklin Kopitzsch and Dirk Brietzke (Editors). Hamburgische Biographie. Personenlexikon, Vol. 1. Christians Verlag, Hamburg 2001, p. 205 
Kirsten Heinsohn. Das jüdische Hamburg. Ein historisches Nachschlagewerk''. Institut für die Geschichte der Deutschen Juden. (Institute for the History of German Jews). Wallstein, Göttingen 2006, p. 190

References

External links 
 "About the project"  Stolpersteine in Hamburg. Retrieved March 29, 2010
 German National Archive 
 Family Tree on GENI.com

1898 births
1939 deaths
People from Hamburg executed at Plötzensee Prison
People executed by guillotine at Plötzensee Prison
Jews in the German resistance
Communist Party of Germany politicians
Executed communists in the German Resistance
Lists of stolpersteine in Germany